SLCC is an acronym that may refer to:

St. Louis Car Co.
St. Louis Community College
Salt Lake Community College
Salt Lake Comic Con
Scottish Legal Complaints Commission
Society of Local Council Clerks
South London Christian College
South Louisiana Community College